B-Sides and Rarities, or variants, may refer to:

B Sides and Rarities (Andy Williams album) (2003)
B-Sides and Rarities (Beach House album) (2017)
B-Sides & Rarities (Boyzone album) (2008)
B-Sides and Rarities (Cake album) (2007)
B-Sides & Rarities (CKY album) (2011)
B-Sides & Rarities (Deftones album) (2005)
Rarities & B-sides (Delerium album) (2015)
B-Sides & Rarities 1996–2003 (2005), by Eels
B-Sides, Remixes and Rarities, by Grand National
B-Sides & Rarities (Nick Cave and the Bad Seeds album) (2005)
Rarities, B-Sides and Other Stuff (1996), by Sarah McLachlan
Rarities, B-Sides and Other Stuff Volume 2 (2008), by Sarah McLachlan
B-Sides & Rarities (Seven Mary Three album) (1997)
B-Sides & Rarities (The Format album) (2007)
Rarities and B-Sides by The Smashing Pumpkins (2005)
The Power of Negative Thinking: B-Sides & Rarities, by The Jesus and Mary Chain (2008)

See also

B-Sides (disambiguation)
List of B-side compilation albums